This article shows All past squads from the Italian professional volleyball team Volley Pesaro from the Serie A League.

All Past Rosters

2017–18

Season 2017–2018, as of September 2017.

2016–17

2015–16

2014–15

2013–14

2012–13

2011–12

2010–11

2009–10

References

External links

Official website 

Italian women's volleyball club squads